Goebbels und Geduldig is a 2002 German war comedy television film about Joseph Goebbels and Nazi Germany, directed by Kai Wessel, written by Peter Steinbach, and starring Ulrich Mühe in the two titular roles.

Plot 

Harry Geduldig is a Jewish lookalike of Goebbels, who has been held captive and a secret by Heinrich Himmler ever since the Nazi rise to power in 1933. In 1944, Goebbels finds out about this and intends to liquidate his double. When the two men meet in person, Geduldig manages to escape and is from now on considered the real Goebbels by his entourage. Meanwhile the real Goebbels is held captive by Geduldig's prison wards and thought to be his own Jewish double.

Cast
Ulrich Mühe: Joseph Goebbels / Harry Geduldig
Eva Mattes: Magda Goebbels
Götz Otto: Brenneisen
Dagmar Manzel: Grete Zipfel
Dieter Pfaff: Eugen Haase
Katharina Thalbach: Hertha Haase
Katja Riemann: Eva Braun
Jürgen Schornagel: Adolf Hitler
Tilo Prückner: Heinrich Hoffmann
Tobias Schenke: Prisoner in Concentration Camp

Production 

Due to its controversial nature as a Nazi satire, the film was in development for seven years, throughout which the script went through a number of substantial changes (18 different scripts were written). Even though the film was in fact finished in 2000, it was widely tested on international film festivals for two years to see how foreign and especially Jewish audiences would react to it, before it was eventually broadcast on ARD in 2002 after the broadcast had been announced and rescheduled several times.

Reception 

German reviewers praised especially the performance of Mühe in his double role. The German Lexikon des internationalen Films praised the cleverly written satire script and its "enlightening wit".

External links

2001 films
2000s satirical films
2000s war comedy films
2001 comedy films
2001 television films
German war comedy films
2000s German-language films
German World War II films
Cultural depictions of Adolf Hitler
Cultural depictions of Joseph Goebbels
Secret histories
Films about Nazi Germany
Films about lookalikes
Films set in 1944
2000s German films